A Get Out of Jail Free card is an element of the board game Monopoly which has become a popular metaphor for something that will get one out of an undesired situation.

Use in the game
The original U.S. version of the board game Monopoly has two Get Out of Jail Free cards, with distinctive artwork. One, a "Community Chest" card, depicts a winged version of the game's mascot, Mr. Monopoly, in his tuxedo as he flies out of an open birdcage. The other, a "Chance" card, shows him booted out of a prison cell in a striped convict uniform. More modern versions of the game have more simply illustrated cards with a set of four jail bars, with the middle two bent outwards, implying a prison escape.

Players move around the Monopoly board according to dice throws. Most of the tiles players land on are properties that can be bought. There is also a tile, the Jail, that can hold players and cause them to lose their turn until certain conditions are met. They can end up in this space by landing on the "Go to Jail" tile, throwing three doubles in a row, or drawing a "Go to Jail" card from Community Chest or Chance. The Get Out of Jail Free card frees the player from jail to continue playing and progress around the board without paying a fee, then must be returned to the respective deck upon playing it.

As the card's text says, it can also be sold by the possessing player to another player for a price that is "agreeable by both".

In law
 In 1567, the prize in Britain's first lottery, commissioned by Queen Elizabeth I and Sir Francis Drake to raise funds for England's navy, included a kind of "get out of jail free card" which the winner could use to excuse any but the most serious crimes.
 In 1967, James Robert Ringrose, one of the FBI's Ten Most Wanted Fugitives at the time, presented a Get Out of Jail Free card to FBI agents after he was arrested.
 In the U.S. Supreme Court case Hudson v. Michigan (2006), the Court ruled that use of evidence against a defendant obtained through search warrants in instances that the police failed to knock-and-announce does not violate the Fourth Amendment of the United States Constitution. The majority opinion by Justice Scalia notes that suppressing evidence in such instances would amount "in many cases to a get-out-of-jail-free card."
 The Patrolmen's Benevolent Association of the City of New York, a large NYPD union, gives out cards to officers to distribute to friends and family, giving them preferential treatment for minor offenses. The cards are commonly referred to as "get out of jail free" cards, and are sometimes sold on eBay.

See also

References

English phrases
Monopoly (game)
Slang